The 2013 Dominion Curling Club Championship was held from November 18 to 23 at the Fort William Curling Club in Thunder Bay, Ontario.

Men

Teams
The teams are listed as follows:

Round-robin standings

Grey pool

Blue pool

Tiebreaker
 5-3

Playoffs

Women
The teams are listed as follows:

Teams

Round-robin standings

Grey pool

Blue pool

Playoffs

References

External links

2013 in Canadian curling
Sports competitions in Thunder Bay
Canadian Curling Club Championships
2013 in Ontario
Curling in Northern Ontario
November 2013 sports events in Canada